Pia Spiten Trulsen (born 9 April 1991) is a Norwegian curler. She is daughter of Pål Trulsen. She competed at the 2015 World Women's Curling Championship in Sapporo, Japan. She also took part in the 2011, 2013 and 2014 European Curling Championships.

References

External links

1991 births
Living people
Norwegian female curlers
World mixed curling champions
Competitors at the 2017 Winter Universiade